Colors 2 may refer to:

Colours 2, 2017 EP by PartyNextDoor
Colors II, 2021 album by Between the Buried and Me